Justas Tamulis (born July 12, 1994) is a professional Lithuanian basketball player for CSU Sibiu of the Liga Națională. He plays for small forward position.

International career 
Tamulis previously represented the Lithuanian youth squads and won three silver medals with them.

Tamulis won gold medal with the Lithuanian team during the 2017 Summer Universiade after defeating the United States' team 74–85 in the final.

References

External links
Justas Tamulis at fiba.com

1994 births
Living people
BC Nevėžis players
BC Pieno žvaigždės players
BC Žalgiris-2 players
CB Breogán players
CSU Sibiu players
Lithuanian expatriate basketball people in Spain
Lithuanian men's basketball players
Small forwards
Sportspeople from Kėdainiai
Universiade gold medalists for Lithuania
Universiade medalists in basketball
Medalists at the 2017 Summer Universiade